Okenia mexicorum is a species of sea slug, specifically a dorid nudibranch, a marine gastropod mollusc in the family Goniodorididae.

Distribution
This species was described from Jalisco, Mexico, and it is known to occur further north, as far as Baja California Sur.

Description
This Okenia has a narrow body and eight to ten pairs of short lateral papillae. There is a median ridge on the back, from which a single papilla arises just in front of the gills. The body is translucent white and the mantle is covered with opaque white pigment. The papillae are red and there are red patches on the sides of the foot.

Ecology
The diet of this species is not known.

References

Goniodorididae
Gastropods described in 2004